Li Qin may refer to:

Li Qin (rower) (born 1981), female Chinese rower
Li Qin (actress) (born 1990), Chinese actress and singer

See also
Qin Yan, originally named Qin Li